Xinyi is an atonal pinyin romanization of various Mandarin Chinese words. It may refer to:

Clothing
 Xinyi (clothing), a form of undershirt worn during the Han era

Mainland China
Xinyi, Jiangsu, a county-level city in Xuzhou, Jiangsu
 Xinyi railway station
Xinyi, Guangdong, a county-level city in Maoming, Guangdong
Xinyi Subdistrict, Harbin, subdivision of Daowai District, Harbin, Heilongjiang
Xinyi Subdistrict, Hegang, subdivision of Dongshan District, Hegang, Heilongjiang
Xinyi Subdistrict, Xiaoyi, subdivision of Xiaoyi, Shanxi
Xinyi, Shandong, town in and subdivision of Yanzhou District, Jining, Shandong
Xinyi, Lishi District, town in and subdivision of Lishi District, Lüliang, Shanxi

Taiwan
Xinyi District, Taipei
Xinyi District, Keelung
Xinyi, Nantou, township of Nantou County
Xinyi Anhe metro station, Da'an District, Taipei

Companies
Xinyi Glass, a glass manufacturer
Xinyi Solar, an affiliate specializing in photovoltaics

Other
 Magnolia biondii, used in traditional Chinese medicine